The History of Jews in Qatar is relatively limited as they were no Jews in the State.

Forum on US-Islamic relations 
As an indication of the opening up of Qatari society to western influence and giving appropriate attention to the Jewish population, the Jewish Telegraphic Agency reported that a forum on U.S.-Islamic relations in Qatar would feature both Israeli and U.S. Jewish participants. Former President Clinton  and Sheikh Hamad Bin Khalifa Al-Thani, the emir of Qatar, were the scheduled keynote speakers at the 2004 US-Islamic Forum in Doha. The forum was sponsored by the Project on US Policy Towards the Islamic World and funded by the Saban Center, founded by American-Israeli entertainment mogul Haim Saban. Participants came from predominantly Islamic countries, including Syria, Saudi Arabia, and Sudan. Martin Kramer, the editor of the Middle East Quarterly, was the sole Israeli participant since Saban and attended as an American.

Jewish-American soldiers 

A news report that described the preparations for U.S. troops stationed in Qatar:

Diplomatic openings

In 2007 a report stated,

Jews in the Arabian Peninsula

History of the Jews in Iraq
History of the Jews in Jordan
History of the Jews in Bahrain
History of the Jews in Kuwait
History of the Jews in Oman
History of the Jews in Saudi Arabia
History of the Jews in the United Arab Emirates
Yemenite Jews

See also
Abrahamic religion
Arab Jews
Arab states of the Persian Gulf
Babylonian captivity
History of the Jews in the Arabian Peninsula
History of the Jews under Muslim rule
Islam and antisemitism
Jewish exodus from Arab lands
Jews outside Europe under Nazi occupation
Judaism and Islam
List of Jews from the Arab World
Mizrahi Jews
Israel-Qatar relations
Law of Return

References

Qatar
Qatar
Qatar
Qatar
History
Jews
Qatar
Qatar